@Large Films (At Large Films) is a full-service commercial production company and visual content agency based in Portland, Oregon, United States. @Large is home to one of the region's largest indoor studios, and has been integral to the growth of a sustainable television/film industry in Portland.

@Large Films produces award-winning visual content, including traditional Broadcast, In-Store/POS, Tradeshow/Exhibition, Web, Educational, Internal and Marketing. Where that visual content is displayed, @Large has the expertise and production capabilities to fit the medium.

History
@Large Films was formerly known as Signature Films, which was started by director Walt Dimick. Signature Films changed operations, ownership, and names in 1999, when it was bought by Juliana Lukasik.  Upon purchase of the company in 1999, Lukasik became the executive producer. Juliana Lukasik is working to improve television commercials targeting women, and Mosh Media, a post-production editing studio.

@Large maintains film crews on location throughout the U.S. and around the world.

Awards
2010 Telly Award "Nintendo DSi", Silver Telly
2010 Telly Award Ubisoft "Raving Rabbids Series" Moses Anshell, Silver Telly
2007 Telly Award "Our World" The Maris Agency
2007 Telly Award "Our World" Lloyd Maris Advertising (Epic Imaging)
2007 Telly Award "Wii Sizzle" Nintendo; 28th Annual Awards; Bronze Telly
2004 40 Under 40 "Juliana Lukasik Executive Producer @ Large Films, Inc" Business Journal
2004 Addy Awards "Peninsula Humane Society" Moses Anshell; Gold Addy
2004 Telly Award "Linda's Picture" (Epic Imaging)
2004-2005 Emmy Awards "You Can be" The Rocky Mountain Southwest Chapter National Academy of Television Arts & Science
2004-2005 Emmy Award "Respect Yourself" The Rocky Mountain Southwest Chapter National Academy of Television Arts & Science
2000 Telly Award "The Christie School- Mandy"
2000 Telly Award "The Christie School- Basketball"

Directors
Brian Belefant
Walt Dimick
Curley Johnson
Greg Penner
Steve Hood
Juliana Lukasik

Producers and Staff
Juliana Lukasik
Jonathan Jenkins
Jessi Knapp
Rachel Bennett
Sarah Lawson
Jade Clark

See also
 List of companies based in Oregon

References

External links
@ Large Films Inc. (official website)

Companies based in Portland, Oregon
Film production companies of the United States
Mass media companies established in 1999
Privately held companies based in Oregon
1999 establishments in Oregon